In January 2009, the city of Albert Lea, Minnesota, began the AARP/Blue Zones Vitality Project. Sponsored by United Health Foundation and led by Dan Buettner, the author of The Blue Zone: Lessons for Living Longer From the People Who've Lived the Longest, the Vitality Project's goal was to add 10,000 years to the lives of Albert Lea residents by encouraging them to make small changes in their daily lives.

Vitality Project Initiatives
The AARP/Blue Zones Vitality Project is divided into several different initiatives. The categories for the initiatives were habitat, social networking, community, and purpose. Some initiatives proved to be specific to one category while others spanned several categories.

 Walking Moai Program: Over 500 participants joined approximately 70 "walking moais", which were groups of 4-10 walkers who agreed to meet once a week and walk to a set destination and back. They collectively walked over 75 million steps and approximately 32,000 miles. In addition, Walking Moai participants did over 2,200 hours of volunteer work. Both steps and volunteer hours were compiled for each group as part of an overall Walking Moai competition.

 Walking School Bus: The Walking School Bus Program found parents and volunteers to walk with groups of children to their respective elementary schools. A walking bus is said to encourage children to walk more, help build social networks, and assist in keeping kids safe on their way to school.

 Vitality Compass: The Vitality Compass is an online tool which is now available nationwide.  It asks participants questions about their eating habits, sleeping habits, levels of stress, and amount of daily activity.  At the end of the online survey, participants are given an age which is their approximate life expectancy. For the purposes of determining the efficacy of certain aspects of the Vitality Project participants were asked to take the Vitality Compass twice; once at the beginning of the program and again at the end.  The average life expectancy for those who took the Vitality Compass at the beginning and at the end of the program increased by three years.

 Volunteering: Vitality Project organizers encouraged participants to volunteer in their community.

 Employers: Employers were encouraged to make their work environments more amenable to practices leading to good health.  For example, some employers added healthy alternatives to vending machines.

 Grocery Stores: Vitality Project organizers encouraged grocery stores to feature those foods which are thought to engender better health and increased life expectancy.

 Neighborhood Picnics: To encourage community building and social networking, several neighborhood picnics were held and all people in a given neighborhood were invited to attend.

 Community Gardens: The City of Albert Lea in cooperation with the Vitality Project made space available for citizens of Albert Lea to plant vegetables and flowers.

 Purpose Workshops: Workshops addressing the importance of finding one's sense of purpose were provided to Albert Leans for free. The workshops were led by Richard Leider, a nationally known executive coach who is also founder and chairman of The Inventure Group.

Walkability
Early in the Vitality Project, organizers invited Dan Burden, a nationally recognized expert in the area of "walkability", to come speak to community leaders and do a "walkability audit". In this audit, Burden toured Albert Lea on foot and pointed out ways that the city could make Albert Lea more walkable. Since then the city has added sidewalk which connects several portions of a well traveled path around Fountain Lake.

Sustainability
The City of Albert Lea, Minnesota put together a sustainability committee which focuses on keeping practices put in place by Vitality Project organizers and volunteers. The long-term goal is that the Albert Lea will have a Vitality Center where leaders of other cities, organizations, and individuals can come to learn about how making small changes in lifestyle as a community can help to improve health and life expectancy.

On October 26, 2009, the Albert Lea City Council voted to designate the lower level of the Jacobson Apartment Building on Broadway Avenue in downtown Albert Lea as the Vitality Center.  The space will be refurbished and updated to accommodate the Vitality Center. The city's goal is that the Vitality Center be opened in the first part of 2010.

Media coverage
The Vitality Project was featured in a variety of news outlets and publications.  Among them are Good Morning America, USA Today, Minneapolis Star Tribune, and Minnesota Public Radio.

See also
Longevity

External links
 Vitality Project Page at AARP
 Richard Leider

References

Blue zones
AARP